The Provincial Highways of Punjab consists of all public highways maintained by the Pakistani province of Punjab. These are not to be confused with national highways which are federal roads maintained by the Government of Pakistan and the National Highway Authority.

List of controlled access highways
 Lahore Ring Road

List of provincial highways

Bahawalnagar–Bhukan Road
Bahawalnagar–Bhawalpure Road
Bahawalnagar–Haroonabad Road
Badiana–Shakargarh Road
Lahore–Raiwind Road (Raiwind Road)
Lahore–Wagah G.T Road
Lahore–Barki Road
Raiwind–Pattoki Road
Shahdara Lahore–Narang Mandi Road
Sheikhupura–Muridke Road
Muridke–Narowal Road
Kamoke–Eimanabad–Sialkot Road
Kamoke–Qila Dildar Singh–Alipur Chatha Road
Gujranwala–Pasrur Road
Gujranwala–Hafizabad Road
Gujranwala–Alipur Chatha Road
Gujranwala–Farooqabad Road
Gujranwala–Sheikhupura Road
Gujranwala–Daska–Sialkot Road
Wazirabad–Sialkot Road
Wazirabad–Daska Road
Wazirabad–Pindi Bhattian Road
Daska–Sambrial Road
Daska–Pasrur Road
Girot–Adhikot–Kalor Kot Road
Narowal–Shakargarh Road
Dinga–Mandi Bahauddin Road
Gujrat–Bhimber Road
Kharian–Dinga–Mandi Bahauddin Road
Kharian–Jalalpure Jattan Road
Mandi Bahauddin–Sarai Alamgir Road
Kasur–Raiwind–Manga Mandi Road
Kasur–Depalpur Road
Kasur Bypass
Pindi Bhattian–Chiniot–Jhang Road
Sargodha-Jhang Road
Jhang–Shorkot–Kabirwala Road
Jhang–Toba Tek Singh–Chichawatni Road
Shorkot City–Shorkot Cantonment Road
Mian Channu–Talamba Road
Mandi–Malakwal–Bhera Road
Phallia–Bherowal-Sial Morr Road
Sialkot–Pasrur Road
Sialkot–Zafarwal Road

See also
 Motorways of Pakistan
 Punjab Highway Patrol
 National Highways of Pakistan
 Transport in Pakistan
 National Highway Authority

References

External links 
 Punjab Highway Department
 Provincial Highways & Rural Access Roads of Punjab

Highways in Punjab
Roads in Punjab, Pakistan
Lists of roads in Pakistan